Narayanganj City Corporation ( - in short: NCC) established in 2011, is one of the city corporations of Bangladesh. It was formed comprising Narayanganj Town, Siddhirganj Municipal area and Kadamrasul Municipality.

NCC is a formation under the local government administration of Bangladesh to regulate the city area of Narayanganj, which is under the Ministry of Local Government & Rural Development (LGRD). It consists of 27 wards including 9 reserve seats for women. Before its establishment as city corporation, it was a municipal corporation. NCC has a total area of 72.43 square kilometers with approximately has the population of 7,09,381 people in the city corporation area.

Current mayor of NCC is Selina Hayat Ivy who was advocated by Bangladesh Awami League.

Significant places

 River Shitalakshya
 Shahid Minar
 Freedom Monument
 Ram Krishna Mission
 Narayanganj Club
 Shudijon Pathagar
 Ali Ahmad Chunka Pathagar
 Bibi Marium Majar
 Siddhirganj Power Station
 Narayanganj Silo
 Kumodiny Trust
 Adamjee EPZ
 Sodeejan Pathagar

Antiquities establishment

 Hajiganj Fort
 Sonakanda Fort
 Kadamrasul Darga
 Asrafia Jame Masjid

List of officeholders

Elections

Election Result 2022

Election Result 2016

Election Result 2011

References

External links 
 Banglapedia

 
City Corporations of Bangladesh
Narayanganj District